Der Yiddish Moment (Yiddish: דער ייִדיש מאָמענט; not to be confused with Der Moment) is a now defunct online Yiddish language newspaper. It was updated irregularly and covers served primarily as a joke and gossip rag for its sole staff member, Robert Kaufstein.

Staff
Editor in Chief - Jacob Kornfeld (Robert Kaufstein)
Assist Editor Dr. Simcha Eckelstein (formerly of Radovitz, Romania) (Robert Kaufstein)
Edit Secretary - Benjamin Eckelstein (Robert Kaufstein)
Founder/President - Dr Otzer Namast (Robert Kaufstein)
Spec. Consultant and Chief Correspondent - Dr R. Fishbein (Robert Kaufstein)
Writer/Correspondent - Louis Gavortshik (Robert Kaufstein)

External links
 Yiddish sources

Yiddish newspapers
Publications established in 2011
Jewish newspapers published in the United States
Jewish-American history
Yiddish-language newspapers published in the United States
Jews and Judaism in New York City
Newspapers published in New York City
Non-English-language newspapers published in New York (state)
Yiddish culture in New York (state)